Johan(n) Gustav Stockenberg (c. 1660 – c. 1710, Tallinn) was a Swedish sculptor, wood carver and stonemason who worked in Sweden, Russia and mainly in Reval (now Tallinn, Estonia).

Life and work

Stockenberg was born in Sweden (probably in Stockholm) and came to Reval (Tallinn) from Copenhagen (Denmark), where he had moved with his brother in law Abraham-César Lamoureux in 1681.

He lived on St. Anthony's Hill in Reval  and took part in the reconstruction of Saint Mary's Cathedral after it had been severely damaged by fire in 1684.
From 1687 he was employed to work on conversions and improvements to Toompea Castle.

In 1688, he constructed the windows, doors and stairs for Maardu Manor, which brought him into conflict with the guild of masons and sculptors as he was not a member of the guild.

Stockenberg died in Reval.

Literature

References

External links

Estonian Baroque sculptors
Swedish male sculptors
Stone carvers
Swedish woodcarvers
Stonemasons
Baroque sculptors
People from Tallinn
History of Tallinn
1660 births
1710 deaths
Year of birth uncertain
Year of death uncertain